The Poor Relief (Ireland) Act 1851 (14 & 15 Vict c 68), sometimes called the Medical Charities Act 1851 and commonly called the Medical Charities Act, was an Act of Parliament passed in 1851 by the Parliament of the United Kingdom. It granted the Poor Law Commission powers over the dispensary system in Ireland.

See also
Irish Poor Laws

References

Poor Law in Britain and Ireland
United Kingdom Acts of Parliament 1851
1851 in Ireland